Michelle Hartman is an academic and translator. She obtained a BA from Columbia College in 1993 and a DPhil from Oxford University in 1998. She is currently a professor of Arabic and francophone literature at the Institute of Islamic Studies, McGill University. She is the author of a number of academic papers and several monographs including "Breaking Broken English: Black Arab Literary Solidarities and the Politics of Language", which won the College Language Association award for creative scholarship in 2020. She is also a translator of contemporary Arabic literature, and has translated twelve novels and a short story collection, including Iman Humaydan Younes’s Wild Mulberries and "The Weight of Paradise",  and Alexandra Chreiteh's Always Coca-Cola and Ali and His Russian Mother, Shahla Ujayli's "Summer with the Enemy" and "A Sky So Close to Us" and Jana Elhassan's "The 99th Floor" and "All the Women Inside Me" among others. Wild Mulberries was shortlisted for the 2009 Banipal Prize for Arabic Literary Translation.

See also
 List of Arabic to English translators

References

Academic staff of McGill University
Alumni of the University of Oxford
Arabic–English translators
Translators from Arabic
Canadian translators
Living people
Canadian women non-fiction writers
Year of birth missing (living people)
Columbia College (New York) alumni